Lazar (Laza) Telečki (Serbian Cyrillic: Лазаp - Лаза Телечки; Kumane now Novi Bečej, Serbia, then Austria-Hungary, 1841 - 1873) was Serbian theater actor and director. He was a prominent member of Serbian National Theater in Novi Sad.

Origin and family 
He came from a poor family. His father died early and his mother took care of him and five siblings on her own.

He was married to Ana. Their daughter is Danica Bandić (1871-1950).

Education 
Telečki was educated with great success and in 1852 he was admitted to Karlovac Gymnasium. He continued his education in Vinkovci, and in Budim he completed a preparatory school for technical studies. After that, Laza Telečki went to Prague, where he enrolled in technical studies, but due to lack of funds, he had to leave school.

After completing partial studies, he came to Novi Sad, where he got a job as a clerk in a law office of Svetozar Miletić (1861—1862).

Acting 

When  Theater was founded in Novi Sad in 1861, Telečki became actor. He also translated plays from German and staged performances of Shakespearean dramas

He played mostly roles from the domestic repertoire and in the first period, his activity was occasional. During his short career, he acted in Belgrade and Zagreb together with the greats of acting, such as: Dimitrije Ružić, Draginja Ružić, Miša Dimitrijević ( actor), Ilija Stanojević, Draga Spasić,  Milka Grgurova and Pera Dobrinović.

Cultural contribution 
He transmitted and adapted to our circumstances about twenty foreign dramas. He also wrote the play "Đurađ Branković: The Last Despot of Smederevo."

Legacy 
 Today, "Days of Laza Telečki" are held in his birthplace, in memory of the great Serbian actor.

 In many places there are streets that bear his name,and the most famous is Novi Sad or the so-called "Street of Fun", which is the center of city events.

Literature 
 Andra Gavrilović, "Famous Serbs of the XIX century", Culture, Belgrade, 1990.

References 

1841 births
1873 deaths
Serbian actors